Indraprasad Gordhanbhai Patel (11 November 1924 – 17 July 2005), popularly known as I. G. Patel, was an Indian economist and a civil servant who served as the fourteenth Governor of the Reserve Bank of India from 1 December 1977 to 15 September 1982.

He served as Director of the London School of Economics, making him the first person of Indian origin to head a higher education institute in the United Kingdom. He also served as Chairperson of the Board of Governors from 1996 to 2001 at Indian Institute of Management Ahmedabad. He also well known for his formidable intellectual powers in the select company of central bankers and economic statesmen such as the "Committee of the Thirty" set up by the former German Chancellor Helmut Schmidt.

He also served as Deputy Administrator at United Nations Development Programme headquarters in New York.

Education
Patel stood first in the Matriculation examination and established a record score that was never beaten. He then came top in his BA at the University of Bombay. He later earned Doctor of Philosophy in economics from King's College at University of Cambridge with a scholarship from the Gaekwads of Baroda. His tutor Austin Robinson regarded him as his best tutee over his entire tenure as fellow of King's.

Career

Civil Service
He was a member of the Indian Economic Service and served in Government of India. He held the rank and post of Special Secretary in the Ministry of Finance and later Secretary to Government of India (Economic Affairs) in the Ministry of Finance.

Academic career
Patel returned to India and joined Baroda college as Professor of Economics and as the Principal in 1949. Eduard Bernstein  later his mentor, invited him to join the Research Department of the International Monetary Fund in 1950. After five years there, Patel came back to Delhi as Economic Adviser to the Ministry of Finance in 1954 and spent the next 18 years in one or other top capacity in the Government of India.

In 1972 he became the Deputy Administrator of the UN Development Programme for five years, returning only to take up the position of the Governor of the Reserve Bank of India. It was during this period marked by turbulence in the foreign exchange markets that Patel's formidable intellectual powers came into use in sessions of the Bank for International Settlements. In 1982 he was appointed Director of the Indian Institute of Management, Ahmedabad, which he helped launch on a trajectory to become the best management school in India.

But again Patel was picked up to serve abroad. In 1984, he was chosen to be the Director of LSE, where he improved the school's finances and added several properties to its portfolio, as well as securing the freehold of the school's Old Building in Houghton Street. He had to handle student protest about LSE's investments in South Africa and their support of Winston Silcott, who had been convicted of the murder of a police officer in the Broadwater Farm riots in Tottenham. Patel handled both the situations with tact and firmness but also with a sympathetic understanding of students' concerns about racism. His initiatives, too, in setting up an innovative inter-departmental forum bore fruit in the Interdisciplinary Management Institute and the Development Studies Institute.

RBI Governor
The Indian Rupee notes of 1000, 5000 and 10,000 denomination and the gold auctions were demonetized during his tenure (he later featured on a special commemorative 1000 rupee note). However, the 1000 notes had to be reintroduced later.

In later life, he taught at the Maharaja Sayajirao University of Baroda, Vadodara. and in 1991 Patel was requested by then Prime Minister P. V. Narasimha Rao to assume the responsibility of the finance minister of India, but this offer was declined by him. He was bestowed the Padma Vibhushan award in 1991 for his furthering of the field of economic science. Indraprasad Gordhanbhai Patel was known as Baba 'IG' from his childhood days in Vadodara, then the capital of the princely state ruled by the Gaekwads of Baroda, where he was born. The post of I.G. Patel Professor of Economics and Government at the London School of Economics was created in his honour; it is currently held by Nicholas Stern.

Personal life
He married Alaknanda Dasgupta, daughter of renowned professor of economics Amiya Kumar Dasgupta and sister of renowned economist Sir Partha Dasgupta.

References

|-

|-

1924 births
2005 deaths
University of Mumbai alumni
Alumni of King's College, Cambridge
Alumni of the University of Cambridge
United Nations Development Programme officials
International Monetary Fund people
Governors of the Reserve Bank of India
Indian bankers
Indian civil servants
Indian institute directors
20th-century Indian economists
People associated with the London School of Economics
Recipients of the Padma Vibhushan in science & engineering
Academic staff of Maharaja Sayajirao University of Baroda
Indian academic administrators
21st-century Indian economists
Chief Economic Advisers to the Government of India
Gujarati people